Joe Cohen (born June 6, 1984) is an American former player of American and Canadian football who was a defensive tackle.  Cohen played college football for the University of Florida, and was a member of a BCS National Championship team.  He was picked by the San Francisco 49ers in the fourth round of the 2007 NFL Draft.  He played professionally for the Detroit Lions of the National Football League (NFL) and the Toronto Argonauts of the Canadian Football League (CFL).

Early years 

Cohen was born in Melbourne, Florida.  He attended Palm Bay High School in Melbourne, and he played high school football for the Palm Bay Pirates.  In high school, he played at the RB position as well as defensive line.  Cincinnati Bengals defensive back Reggie Nelson and U.S. Olympic runner Xavier Carter were teammates of Cohen at Palm Bay High School.  Following his high school career, Cohen played in the 2003 U.S. Army All-American Bowl with future Florida Gators teammates Chris Leak and Andre Caldwell.

College career 

Cohen accepted an athletic scholarship to attend the University of Florida in Gainesville, Florida, where he played for coach Ron Zook and coach Urban Meyer's Florida Gators football team from 2003 to 2006.  As a senior in 2006, he was a member of the Gators' BCS National Championship team.

Professional career 

On November 15, 2009, Cohen made the first sack of his pro career, sacking Minnesota Vikings quarterback Brett Favre in a 27–10 loss.

Cohen signed with the Toronto Argonauts of the CFL on June 7, 2012, and played in five regular season games for the Argos.

Life after playing career 

He is currently an assistant football coach for the Viera Hawks at Viera High School in Viera, Florida.

See also 
 List of Florida Gators in the NFL Draft

References

Bibliography 

 Carlson, Norm, University of Florida Football Vault: The History of the Florida Gators, Whitman Publishing, LLC, Atlanta, Georgia (2007).  .

External links 

  Joe Cohen – Florida Gators player profile

1984 births
Living people
American football defensive ends
American football defensive tackles
Detroit Lions players
Florida Gators football players
Miami Dolphins players
Oakland Raiders players
People from Melbourne, Florida
Players of American football from Florida
San Francisco 49ers players